Canarium latistipulatum is a tree in the family Burseraceae. The specific epithet  is from the Latin meaning "wide stipule".

Description

Distribution and habitat
Canarium latistipulatum is endemic to Malaysian Borneo. Its habitat is lowland forests.

References

latistipulatum
Endemic flora of Borneo
Trees of Borneo
Plants described in 1930